Ampil Pram Daeum  is a khum (community) of Bavel District in Battambang Province in north-western Cambodia.

Villages

 Dangkao Kramang
 Siem
 Ampil
 Sthapor
 Ta Khiev
 Buo Run
 Doung
 Sthab Por Pi

References

Communes of Battambang province
Bavel District